Evergreen is a census-designated place (CDP) in Flathead County, Montana, United States. Its population was 8,149 at the 2020 census, up from 7,616 at the 2010 census, and 6,215 in 2000.

Geography
Evergreen is located in central Flathead County at  (48.228746, -114.273928), on the northeast side of Kalispell, the county seat. It is bordered to the east by the Flathead River, and the Whitefish River flows through the western side of the CDP.

U.S. Route 2 passes through the community, leading northeast  to West Glacier, at the entrance to Glacier National Park. Montana Highway 35 leads southeast from Evergreen  to Bigfork.

Climate
This climatic region is typified by large seasonal temperature differences, with warm to hot (and often humid) summers and cold (sometimes severely cold) winters.  According to the Köppen Climate Classification system, Evergreen has a humid continental climate, abbreviated "Dfb" on climate maps.

Demographics

As of the census of 2020, there were 8,149 people and 2,923 households in the CDP. The population density was 884.4 people per square mile. The racial makeup of the CDP was 93.9% White, 0.0% Black or African American, 2.2% Native American, 0.5% Asian, 0.1% Pacific Islander, 2.9% from two or more races and Hispanic or Latino of any race were 6.4% of the population.

In the CDP, the population was spread out, with 23.5% under the age of 18, and 12.1% who were 65 years of age or older. The percentage of females was 54.8. 

The median income for a household in the CDP was $59,338, and the per capita income for the past 12 months was $24,527. The number of people in poverty was 7.4%.

See also

 List of census-designated places in Montana

References

External links

Census-designated places in Flathead County, Montana
Census-designated places in Montana